Verena Altenberger (born 11. November 1987 in Schwarzach im Pongau) is an Austrian actress.

Early life 
Verena Altenberger grew up in the Austrian state of Salzburg in Dorfgastein, Hallein and Oberalm and spent part of her youth at Schloss Winkl, a former residence of nobility, where her mother was the principal of the Winklhof agricultural school. Aged 18, Altenberger went to Vienna to study acting, and initially auditioned at the Max Reinhardt Seminar, but was not accepted. Consequently, she began to pursue a bachelor’s degree in Mass Media and Communication Science at the University of Vienna, from which she successfully graduated. As of September 2011, she studied drama at the Music and Arts University of the City of Vienna and successfully graduated in June 2015.

Theater 
During the 2010/2011 season, Verena Altenberger was part of the Junge Burg Ensemble at the Vienna Burgtheater, where she performed the title role in Alice in Wonderland (“Alice im Wunderland”), Blanche Barrow in Bonny and Clyde, and Isolde Weißhand in Tricky Love – Tristan und Isolde, among several other roles. In the 2013/2014 season, she played the role of Lore in Puss in Boots (“Der gestiefelte Kater”) at the Burgtheater, and in 2015 she appeared on stage at the Vienna Volkstheater in Haben in the role of Rozí.

In Jedermann (Everyman) at the 2021 Salzburg Festival, she took on the role of Paramour (Buhlschaft) alongside German actor Lars Eidinger in the title role.Both will be on stage together again at the 2022 revival of Jedermann in Salzburg.

Film and television 
In the Austrian television series CopStories, Verena Altenberger portrayed the role of Chantal from 2013 to 2018. In Mission: Impossible – Rogue Nation she appeared in a scene as the assistant to the Director of the Vienna State Opera. In 2016, Altenberger landed the title role in the German comedy series Magda macht das schon!, in which she plays a Polish geriatric nurse.

In 2017, she was nominated for the German Comedy Award for her portrayal of Magda in the category “Best Actress/Best Actor”.
Altenberger was awarded the 2017 Diagonale Acting Award and Best Actress at the Moscow International Film Festival, the Bavarian movie award for best newcomer and the Austrian movie award for lead actress and many more for the lead role in The Best of All Worlds ("Die beste aller Welten"). In this film by Adrian Goiginger, she portrayed a woman addicted to heroin who tries to overcome her addiction and hide it from her son – portrayed by Jeremy Miliker – whom she loves more than anything and to whom she wants to be the best mother possible. The film premiered at the Berlinale 2017, where it was awarded the Compass-Perspektive-Award.
In Climb Every Mountain: Sound of Music Revisited ("The Makemakes in Hollywood – Auf den Spuren von The Sound of Music", 2017), Verena Altenberger can be heard as narrator.
  In fall 2017, she was filming for the ORF/BR/ARTE drama Das Wunder von Wörgl in the role of Rosa Unterguggenberger alongside Austrian actor and film director Karl Markovics, which was directed by Swiss director Urs Egger. At the beginning of 2018, she shot under David Schalko for M – A City Hunts a Murderer (“M – Eine Stadt sucht einen Mörder”), and in April 2018 she filmed for the historical drama Ein Dorf wehrt sich – Das Geheimnis von Altaussee, a co-production of ZDF, ORF and Arte.

In 2018, Altenberger succeeded Matthias Brandt in the German crime series Polizeiruf 110 and took on the role of Munich investigator Elisabeth “Bessie” Eyckhoff in the episode Der Ort, von dem die Wolken kommen. In the third season of the crime series Shades of Guilt ("SCHULD nach Ferdinand von Schirach") she played the role of Sheryl.

In September 2019, she filmed the documentary Virginia – The Unsolved Riddle of the Salzburg Mafia Bride ("Virginia – Das ungelöste Rätsel der Salzburger Mafiabraut Virginia Hill") about organized crime figure Virginia Hill alongside Michael Dangl as Hans Hauser for Servus TV, directed by Sascha Köllnreiter and produced by Adrian Goiginger and Peter Wildling.  In the Arte television thriller Hunt for the Bosses ("Die Spur der Mörder", 2019), Altenberger played Interpol investigator Carla Orlando alongside Heino Ferch as chief investigator Ingo Thiel. In late 2019, she was shooting for the ORF/BR comedy Schönes Schlamassel by Wolfgang Murnberger alongside Maxim Mehmet, in which she embodied Anne, a non-Jewish bookseller who is very passionate about Judaism. In February 2019, Altenberger was a guest on Claudia Stöckl’s program Frühstück bei mir on the Austrian radio station Ö3. In December 2019, Altenberger was a guest on the satirical late-night talk show Wir sind Kaiser.

Verena Altenberger collaborated again with director Adrian Goiginger in 2020 for the production Märzengrund, based on the play of the same name by Felix Mitterer. Simultaneously, she filmed the series Wild Republic for MagentaTV in South Tyrol. In 2021, Altenberger went bald for her portrayal of a cancer patient in Chris Raiber's debut film Unter der Haut der Stadt. In the tragicomedy Me, We, which premiered at the Graz Diagonale in June 2021, she embodied the role of Marie, who sets off for Lesbos to provide initial care for refugees arriving at an NGO camp on the coast.

Austrian Film Academy 
In November 2021, Verena Altenberger took over the presidency of the Austrian Film Academy together with director and producer Arash T. Riahi from their longtime predecessor duo Stefan Ruzowitzky and Ursula Strauss.

Filmography (Selection)

Awards and nominations 
 For The Best of All Worlds (Die beste aller Welten):
 2017: Diagonale – Awarded Best Actress
 2017: Internationales Filmfestival Moskau – Awarded Best Actress
 2017: Deutscher Regiepreis Metropolis – Awarded Best Actress
 2018: Bayerischer Filmpreis 2017 – Awarded Best Actress
 2018: Österreichischer Filmpreis 2018 – Awarded Best Actress in a Leading Role
 2018: Riverside International Film Festival 2018 – Awarded Best Actress
 2018: Harlem International Film Festival 2018 – Awarded Best Actress
 2018: Worldfest Houston Independent International Film Festival 2018 – Awarded Best Actress
 2018: Milan International Film Festival 2018 – Awarded Best Acting Performance
 2018: Hell's Half Mile Film & Music Festival Bay City, Michigan 2018 – Awarded Best Lead Actress
 2018: Meraki Film Festival 2018 – Awarded Best Actress
 2018: Courage Film Festival 2018 – Awarded Best Actress
 2018: Romyverleihung 2018 – Nominated in the category Most Popular Actress Cinema/TV-Film
 2018: Deutscher Schauspielpreis 2018 – Nominated in the category Best Actress in a Leading Role
 Für Magda macht das schon!
 2017: Deutscher Comedypreis – Nominated in the category Best Actress/Best Actor
 Für Das Wunder von Wörgl:
 2019: Romyverleihung 2019 –  Nominated in the category Most Popular Actress Cinema/TV-Film
 2019: International Salzburg woman of the year
 2020: Romyverleihung 2020 – Nominated in the category Most Popular Actress
 2021: Romyverleihung 2021 – Nominated in the category Most Popular Actress
 2021: Nestroy-Theaterpreis 2021 – Nominated in the category Most Popular Actress TV-series
 2022: Jupiter Award – Nominated in the category Best Actress (Cinema, TV, Streaming) (National) for Wild Republic

References

External links 

 
 Verena Altenberger at Agentur Reinholz
 Official Website

21st-century Austrian actresses

1987 births
Living people